Blank is a surname. Notable people with the surname include:

Amanda Blank (born 1983), American rapper and singer
Arthur Blank (born 1942), American businessman and a co-founder of Home Depot
Barbie Blank (born 1987), American model and professional wrestler better known as Kelly Kelly
Boris Blank (musician) (born 1952), Swiss musician
Carla Blank, American choreographer, writer, and editor
Hanne Blank (born 1969), American historian
Harrod Blank (born 1963), American documentary filmmaker
Isaac Blank (1913–2006), better known as Ted Grant, South African-British Marxist, co-founder of the Militant Tendency
Israel Blank, grandfather of Vladimir Lenin from mother's side
Jessica Blank, American actor, playwright, and novelist
Joani Blank (1937–2016), writer and videographer
Johann Blank (1904–1983), German water polo player
Jonah Blank, American author
Joost de Blank (1908-1968), Archbishop of Cape Town, South Africa
Julius Blank (1925–2011), semiconductor pioneer
Karl Blank (1728–1793), Russian architect
Kenny Blank (born 1977), American actor
Les Blank (1935–2013), American documentary filmmaker
Marc Blank, American computer game designer
Maria Alexandrovna Ulyanova (née Blank) (1835–1916),Vladimir Lenin's mother
Marion Blank, developmental psychologist
Martin Blank (disambiguation)
Peter Blank (born 1962), German javelin thrower
Rebecca Blank (1955-2023), American educator
Renate Blank (1941–2021), German politician
Stefan Blank (born 1977), German footballer
Steve Blank (born 1953), entrepreneur
Theodor Blank (1905–1972), German politician
Trent Blank (born 1989), American baseball coach
Victor Blank (born 1942), British businessman

See also
Blanc

German-language surnames
Jewish surnames